Stoke Golding is a village and civil parish in the Hinckley and Bosworth district of Leicestershire, England, close to the county border with Warwickshire. According to the 2001 census, the total population was 1,721 in just over 700 houses. The population at the 2011 census was 1,684 in 723 households.
The village is bordered on one side by the Ashby Canal, well-used for recreational purposes.

History
Stoke Golding's unique historical claim to fame is that in 1485 the people of the village witnessed the unofficial rural coronation of Henry VII, the first Tudor monarch. His defeat of King Richard III, last of the Plantagenets, at the Battle of Bosworth marked the end of the Wars of the Roses, and heralded the accession to the throne of the Tudor dynasty of three Kings and two Queens. In so doing Stoke Golding claims to be the "Birthplace of the Tudor Dynasty".

After Henry Tudor was victorious over Richard III at the Battle of Bosworth, which took place in the healthy marshland known as the Redemore between Stoke Golding, Dadlington, Shenton and Sutton Cheney, Henry's entourage retired to hilly ground near the village of Stoke Golding. Here the impromptu coronation of King Henry VII was performed with a circlet by tradition retrieved from a nearby thorn bush. This area became known as Crown Hill and Crownhill Field.

Historical local accounts of the Battle of Bosworth field tell of the villagers climbing on to the battlements of the church of St Margaret of Antioch to view the bloody battle on 22 August 1485.
The window sills of the Church show grooves which legend has it were caused by the soldiers sharpening their swords and axes on the eve of the battle.
After the fighting, large pits were dug around Stoke Golding and the villages of Dadlington and Fenny Drayton, the nearest villages to the complete site of the battlefield, for the burial of the dead.
King Henry VII then rewarded some of his followers and knighted the more senior of his supporters.

Facilities
Stoke Golding has an impressive Grade I listed Saxon church, that of St Margaret of Antioch, a Church of England church in the Diocese of Leicester.  The church is roughly in the centre of the village and is a good example of the churches of that period. There is a Methodist church in the village that was first opened in 1857.

Transport facilities include a local bus hourly (except Sundays) to Nuneaton and Hinckley.

Schools
The primary school children (4 years to 11 years) of Stoke Golding and nearby villages mostly attend St Margaret's Church of England Primary School that is located next to the church within the village. St Martin's Catholic Academy is a secondary school located in the village.

Sport
A short lived greyhound racing track was opened on 19 April 1930. The racing was independent (not affiliated to the sports governing body the National Greyhound Racing Club) and was known as a flapping track, which was the nickname given to independent tracks. The racing was run by the Stoke Golding Greyhound Association and the main race distance was 450 yards.

Notable people

Francis Brokesby
Martine Croxall, news presenter on BBC News
Sir William Edge, 1st Baronet
Sir Henry Firebrace

References

External links

 Link showing details of Scouting in the Village
 Stoke Golding village website
 The annotated "Stoke Golding Country Dance"; English Folk Dance

Villages in Leicestershire
Civil parishes in Leicestershire
Hinckley and Bosworth